The Gowers Review of Intellectual Property was an independent review of UK intellectual property (IP) focusing on UK copyright law that was published in December 2006. The then Chancellor of the Exchequer Gordon Brown commissioned Andrew Gowers to lead the review in December 2005. The Review was published on 6 December 2006 as part of the Chancellor's annual pre-budget report. The review concludes that the UK's intellectual property system is fundamentally strong but made 54 recommendations for improvements.

Recommendations

Instruments - Balance 
 1 - "Amend section 60(5) of the Patents Act 1977 to clarify the research exception to facilitate experimentation, innovation and education"
 2 - "Enable educational provisions to cover distance learning and interactive whiteboards by 2008 by amending sections 35 and 36 of the Copyright, Designs and Patents Act 1988"
 3 - "The European Commission should retain the length of protection on sound recordings and performers’ rights at 50 years"
 4 - "Policy makers should adopt the principle that the term and scope of protection for IP rights should not be altered retrospectively"

Instruments - Coherence 
 5 - The Patent Office "should undertake joint working with African patent offices from mid-2007, with the aim of:
 helping them to take advantage of the flexibilities currently existing in the WTO/TRIPS architecture where appropriate; and
 encouraging them to make positive use of IP rights through dissemination of information in patents"
 6 - "Encourage the international community under the auspices of the WTO to review the TRIPS status of the least developed countries prior to 2016 and consider whether further extension for reaching TRIPS compliance would be appropriate"
 7 - "Government should encourage WTO members to ratify the amendments to TRIPS to make importation of drugs easier and cheaper"

Instruments - Flexibility 
 8 - "Introduce a limited private copying exception by 2008 for format-shifting for works published after the date that the law comes into effect. There should be no accompanying levies for consumers"
 9 - "Allow private copying for research to cover all forms of content. This relates to the copying, not the distribution, of media"
 10a - "Amend s.42 of the Copyright, Designs and Patents Act 1988 by 2008 to permit libraries to copy the master copy of all classes of work in permanent collection for archival purposes and to allow further copies to be made from the archived copy to mitigate against subsequent wear and tear"
 10b - "Enable libraries to format-shift archival copies by 2008 to ensure records do not become obsolete"
 11 - "Propose that Directive 2001/29/EC be amended to allow for an exception for creative, transformative or derivative works, within the parameters of the Berne Three Step Test."
 12 - "Create an exception to copyright for the purpose of caricature, parody or pastiche by 2008"
 13 - "Propose a provision for orphan works to the European Commission, amending Directive 2001/29/EC"
 14a - "The Patent Office should issue clear guidance on the parameters of a ‘reasonable search’ for orphan works, in consultation with rights holders, collecting societies, rights owners and archives, when an orphan works exception comes into being"
 14b - "The Patent Office should establish a voluntary register of copyright; either on its own, or through partnerships with database holders, by 2008.
 15 - "Make it easier for users to file notice of complaints procedures relating to Digital Rights Management (DRM) tools by providing an accessible web interface on the Patent Office website by 2008"
 16 - The Department for Trade and Industry "should investigate the possibility of providing consumer guidance on DRM systems through a labelling convention without imposing unnecessary regulatory burdens"
 17 - "Maintain policy of not extending patent rights beyond their present limits within the areas of software, business methods and genes"

Operations - Award 
 18 - "The Government should encourage the EPO to pursue work sharing with the USPTO and JPO"
 19 - "The Patent Office should pursue work sharing arrangements with EPC member States, and trilaterally with the USA and Japan to reduce cross-national duplication of effort"
 20 - "Continue to support and expedite the establishment of a single Community Patent through negotiations in Europe"
 21 - "Government should support the London Agreement as an interim step towards COMPAT, and as an improvement in its own right"
 22 - "Maintain a high quality of patents awarded by increasing the use of ‘section 21’ observations: streamlining procedures and raising awareness"
 23 - "The Patent Office should conduct a pilot of Beth Noveck’s Community Patent Review in 2007 in the UK to determine whether this would have a positive impact on the quality of the patent stock"
 24 - "The Patent Office should develop stronger links with universities and other research institutions, including through short placements, to ensure that IP examiners are aware of recent developments in technology.
 25a - "Introduce accelerated grant process for patents to complement the accelerated examination and combined patent search and examination procedures"
 25b - "Introduce fast track registration for trade marks"

Operations - Use 
 26 - "The Patent Office should provide comprehensive information on how to register and use IP rights for firms registering with Companies House.
 27 - "Improve SME business IP support by establishing formal collaboration between the Patent Office and Business Link and by conducting a pilot replicating the French ‘IP Genesis’ scheme"
 28 - "Investigate how best to provide practical IP advice to UK firms operating in foreign markets, in coordination with industry bodies, the Patent Office and UK Trade and Investment"
 29 - "The Patent Office should develop ‘Business-to-Business’ model IP licences through industry consultation, and assessment of the Lambert model licences"
 30a - "The Patent Office should publish and maintain an open standards web database, linked to the EPO’s esp@cenet web database, containing all patents issued under licence of right"
 30b - "The Patent Office should publish and maintain an open standards web database, linked to esp@cenet containing all expired patents"
 31 - The Department for Trade and Industry (DTI) should consider whether guidance for firms on reporting of intangible assets could be improved, including the provision of model IP reports"
 32 - "Form a working group with Patent Office, RDA and Business Link representation, to identify and promote best practice to maximise the use of effective schemes nationwide"
 33 - "The Review invites the OFT to consider conducting a market survey into the UK collecting societies to ensure the needs of all stakeholders are being met"
 34 - "Increase cooperation between the UK Patent Office, the Office of Fair Trading and the Competition Commission to ensure that competition and IP policy together foster competitive and innovative markets for the benefit of consumers"

Operations - Enforcement 
 35 - "The Patent Office should continue to raise public awareness, focussing in particular on the wider impacts of IP crime, and the exceptions to rights"
 36 - "Match penalties for online and physical copyright infringement by amending section 107 of the Copyright, Designs and Patents Act 1988 by 2008"
 37 - "Monitor success of current measures to combat unfair competition in cases relating to IP, and if changes are found to be ineffective, Government should consult on appropriate changes"
 38 - "DCA should review the issues raised in its forthcoming consultation paper on damages and seek further evidence to ensure that an effective and dissuasive system of damages exists for civil IP cases and that it is operating effectively. It should bring forward any proposals for change by the end of 2007"
 39 - "Observe the industry agreement of protocols for sharing data between ISPs and rights holders to remove and disbar users engaged in ‘piracy’. If this has not proved operationally successful by the end of 2007, Government should consider whether to legislate"
 40 - The Department of Trade and Industry (DTI) should consult on measures to tighten regulation of occasional sales and markets by 2007"
 41 - The UK Home Office should recognise IP crime as an area for Police action as a component of organised crime within the updated National Community Safety Plan.
 42 - Give Trading Standards the power to enforce copyright infringement by enacting section 107A of the Copyright, Designs and Patents Act 1988 by 2007"
 43 - Strengthen Practice Directions, to provide greater encouragement for parties to mediate, in particular this should raise the profile of mediation with judges"
 44 - "The Patent Office should consult with the Judicial Studies Board to determine the extent to which the complexity of IP law may give rise to a training need for judges and magistrates and their legal advisers"
 45 - "Support the establishment of a single EU court to adjudicate cross-border IP disputes by promoting the European Patent Litigation Agreement"

Operations - Governance 
 46 - "Establish a new Strategic Advisory Board for IP policy (SABIP), covering the full range of IP rights, reporting to the minister responsible, by 2007. The Board should be drawn from a wide range of external experts as well as key senior policy officials from relevant government departments, and should be based in London. £150,000 should be allocated to fund the secretariat by the Patent Office"
 47 - "The Patent Office should provide an annual IP strategic analysis fund of £500,000 managed by the policy advisory board in consultation with the IP Policy Directorate"
 48 - "Patent Office should introduce a clear split of responsibility between delivery and policy directorates"
 49 - "Encourage IP policy officials to obtain policy experience outside the IP Policy Branch, and support short industry placement schemes for policy staff"
 50 - "Realign UK Patent Office administrative fees to cover costs more closely on Patent Office administrative operations (e.g. granting patents)"
 51 - "Increase the transparency of Patent Office financial reporting"
 52 - "Ensure that under current arrangements in the Patent Office, there is a clear internal separation of responsibility between the granting of rights and disputes over their ownership or validity. This should be achieved by clearly separating the line management structures"
 53 - "Change the name of the UK Patent Office to the UK Intellectual Property Office (UKIPO) to reflect the breadth of functions the office has, and to dispel confusion"
 54 - "DCA should review the issues raised in relation to IP cases and the fast track, and seek views in the context of its forthcoming consultation paper, which will consider the case track limits, and how the claims process can be made more timely, proportionate and cost-effective. It should bring forward any proposals for change by the end of 2007"

Private copying 
The review coincided with a 2006 survey carried out on behalf of the National Consumer Council, which indicated that over half of British adults infringe copyright law by duplicating and ripping music CDs. Following the review, in January 2008 the government initiated a public consultation period on proposals to legalise personal copying.

Copyright terms extension 
On November 27, 2006, it was reported that Gowers would not recommend for the copyright term of recorded music to be extended from the current 50 years after the date of recording. The British Phonographic Industry and prominent musicians, such as Cliff Richard and Ian Anderson, had lobbied for an extension to 95 years, matching the length of copyright provided in the United States; other musicians, such as Dave Rowntree of Blur provided counteropinions. The Gowers Review found that the UK, compared with the USA, suffers no apparent impediment to creativity due to this disparity. To coincide with the publication of the review on the 6 December a full-page advertisement entitled Fair play for musicians, was taken in the Financial Times of December 7, stating "We call upon the UK Government to support the extension of copyright on sound recordings", and was signed by over 4,500 musicians, including a few dead ones.

Repercussions
Richard Sargeant, a civil servant who wrote large amounts of the Review, was later hired by Google. In January 2009, as Google's "public policy manager", he called for reforms to incorporate exemptions similar to the United States' fair use doctrine into UK and Europe copyright law.

References

External links
 Gowers Review of Intellectual Property, official site on the website of HM Treasury
 Gowers review of intellectual property, UK Intellectual Property Office
 Response to the Gowers Review of Intellectual Property, British Academy, April 19, 2006
  , Open Rights Group press briefing, November 7, 2006
 Intellectual property rights to be reviewed in UK, The Register (syndicated from OUT-LAW), December 5, 2005
 Copying own CDs 'should be legal', BBC News Online, October 29, 2006
 No copyright extension for songs, BBC News Online, November 27, 2006
 Musicians sign copyright advert, BBC News Online, December 7, 2006
 Sir Hugh Laddie's response to the Gowers Review, June 2007

2006 documents
Works about intellectual property law
Economics of intellectual property
Intellectual property law
Politics of the United Kingdom
United Kingdom copyright law